Shalku (also Romanized as Shālkū, Shalkoo, and Shālakū; also known as Masjed Shālīkū, Masjid Shālīku, and Shālīkūh) is a village in Howmeh Rural District, in the Central District of Rasht County, Gilan Province, Iran. At the 2006 census, its population was 683, in 190 families.

References 

Populated places in Rasht County